Chetram Jatav was a freedom fighter who participated in the Indian Rebellion of 1857. He joined the mutiny on 26 May 1857 in the Soro region of Eta district, North-Western Provinces (now Uttar Pradesh). Them were tied to a tree and shot.

Life
According to legends, Maharaja Patiala saw a man who was carrying a lion on his back. On being asked, it was found that the man had killed the lion without a weapon. The king asked him to join his army. At the instance of the king, he joined the army. The person's name was Cheta Ram Jatav. Cheta Ram fought the British. Seeing the British harassing the people, he fought them, after which the British arrested him and tied him with a tree.The circumstances of Jatav's death have been highlighted by Badri Narayan Tiwari, a Subaltern historian from the G. B. Pant Institute of Social Sciences in Allahabad, but his life appears to be lost to history. Other sources have repeated Tiwari's research, which was taken from Swatantrata Sangram Mein Achhuton Ka Yogdan, a 1990 work written by D. C. Dinkar.

In popular culture
The Bahujan Samaj Party has adopted Jatav and some others who died as a result of the 1857 rebellion as icons of Dalit heroism. According to Tiwari, Dalit intellectuals supported by BSP, which is trying to mobilise grassroot Dalits using local heroes, histories, myths and legends found a wealth of resources in the oral history of the regions of Uttar Pradesh centering around the 1857 rebellion. The political strategy of the party is to tell and retell the stories of these heroes, build memorials and organize celebrations around their stories repeatedly to build a collective memory in the psyche of the people. The stories are narrated in such a manner that the Dalits imagine the story of the making of this nation in which they played a significant role.

References

Further reading

Revolutionaries of the Indian Rebellion of 1857
Year of birth unknown
19th-century executions by British India
People from Etah district
Dalit history
Bahujan Samaj Party
Indian independence activists from Uttar Pradesh